The United States Ambassador to South Korea is the chief diplomatic representative of the United States accredited to the Republic of Korea. The ambassador's official title is "Ambassador Extraordinary and Plenipotentiary of the United States of America to the Republic of Korea."

Korea

After the United States–Korea Treaty of 1882 was negotiated, diplomatic representatives were sent from Washington to Seoul. From then until 1905, there were several Envoys and Consuls General, each heading what was called a legation. After the Japanese had defeated the Chinese in 1895, and the Russians in 1905, Korea began to see its independence disappear. By 1910, Japan had annexed Korea and the U.S. no longer had a diplomatic presence in Korea.

Envoy, Resident Minister and Consul-General

South Korea
At the end of World War II, U.S. forces accepted Japan's surrender in southern Korea, and Soviet forces accepted the surrender of the Japanese in northern Korea. Talks to agree upon a unity government for Korea failed, and in 1948, two separate Korean states were created: the Republic of Korea (South Korea) and the Democratic People's Republic of Korea (North Korea). The United States established diplomatic relations with the new South Korean government, but did not recognize North Korea. Other countries, like the Soviet Union, recognized the Pyongyang government in North Korea, but did not initially establish relations with the South Korean government in Seoul.

The United States has maintained constant diplomatic relations with South Korea since 1948, with formal recognition of the Republic of Korea on 1 January 1949.  The American special representative, John J. Muccio, became the first Ambassador to the Republic of Korea on March 1, 1949.

The Embassy of the United States in Seoul has jurisdiction over APP Busan.

Ambassador

See also
List of ambassadors of South Korea to the United States
List of United States Special Representatives for North Korea
Ambassadors of the United States
Foreign relations of North Korea
Foreign relations of South Korea
North Korea–United States relations
South Korea–United States relations

Notes

References
 Brazinsky, George. (2007). Nation Building in South Korea:Koreans, Americans, and the Making of a Democracy. Chapel Hill, North Carolina: University of North Carolina Press. ;  OCLC 263714059
 Funabashi, Yōichi. (2007). The Peninsula Question: a Chronicle of the Second Korean Nuclear Crisis.  Washington, D.C.: Brookings Institution Press. ;  OCLC 156811113
 Halleck, Henry Wager. (1861).  International law: or, Rules regulating the intercourse of states in peace and war 	New York: D. Van Nostrand. OCLC 852699
 Korean Mission to the Conference on the Limitation of Armament, Washington, D.C., 1921-1922. (1922). Korea's Appeal to the Conference on Limitation of Armament. Washington: U.S. Government Printing Office. OCLC 12923609
 Schnabel, James F. (1972). Policy and Direction: the First Year, Vol. 3 of United States Army in the Korean War.  Washington, D.C.: Government Printing Office.
United States Department of State: Background notes on South Korea

External links
 United States Department of State: Chiefs of Mission for Korea
 United States Department of State: South Korea
 United States Embassy in Seoul

 
South Korea
United States